General elections were held in Mauritius on 3 July 2005, with polls counted on 4 July.

The Alliance Sociale, a coalition led by the Mauritian Labour Party (PTr) and including the Mauritian Party of Xavier-Luc Duval (PMXD), the Mauritian Social Democrat Party (MSN), Les Verts (Greens), the Republican Movement, and the Mauritian Militant Socialist Movement (MMSM), won the election with 42 of the 70 seats (38 elected directly, and another 4 nominated under the country's "best loser" system).  The PTr leader, Navin Ramgoolam, was subsequently appointed Prime Minister on 5 July, with Rashid Beebeejaun as his deputy.  Three other coalition leaders were elected, but the Les Verts leader failed to oust outgoing Prime Minister Paul Bérenger from his constituency.

24 seats were won by Bérenger's coalition, consisting of the Mauritian Militant Movement (MMM) and the Militant Socialist Movement (MSM); of these, 22 were directly elected and 2 nominated as "best losers".  Pravind Jugnauth, the MSM leader, lost his seat to an Alliance Sociale candidate.

The two seats reserved for the island of Rodrigues were won by the Rodrigues Movement (OPR); another 2 OPR members were appointed as "best losers."

8 of the 70 seats are allocated to "best losers," appointed to ensure that ethnic and religious minorities are equitably represented.

Results
The total number of votes is higher than the population because Mauritians get to vote for up to 3 times in a single election.

References

Elections in Mauritius
Mauritius
Election, general
Election and referendum articles with incomplete results